Nikos Kostenoglou (born 3 October 1970) is a Greek football manager and former professional footballer who played as a defender. His nickname was "Father", because of his strong devotion to religion.

Club career
Kostenoglou started his career as a football player in 1989 at Skoda Xanthi, and was transferred in 1994 at AEK Athens for 100 million drachmas.
He became a regular in the following season, alongside Stelios Manolas. Kostenoglou played mainly in the position of centre-back, but he was also used as a right-back and was distinguished for his speed, his correct placements, his clean play but also for his seriousness and morals. He was never the star player of AEK, but he was a player with a lot of participations, usually as a starter and with a stable performances, while he was at times one of the leaders of the "yellow-blacks". With AEK he won 4 Greek cups and 1 Super Cup.He finished his career at AEK Athens, in the season the summer 2005 after 11 years of presence at the club.

International career
Kostenoglou played once with Greece in a 2-1 friendly win over Israel in Chalcis in 24 January 1996.

Managerial career
After finishing his playing career Kostenoglou joined the coaching staff at AEK Athens Academy. Two years later he was promoted to assistant to Lorenzo Serra Ferrer in the men's team. When Ferrer was sacked in early 2008, Kostenoglou took over until the end of the 2007–08 season. AEK Athens was the best team that season, clinched first position in the league, but lost the championship due to legal action. Kostenoglou stepped down as coach on 16 May 2008 following the hiring of Giorgos Donis.
On 20 November 2008, he was announced as the new manager of Asteras Tripolis, in January 2011, he succeeded Jørn Andersen as manager of AEL. On 6 October 2011, he returned to AEK Athens for a second spell as manager, replacing Manolo Jiménez. His contract came to an end in 25 June 2012.

In following periods he had brief spells at Skoda Xanthi in 2012 and Anorthosis Famagusta in 2014. while in July of the same year he was hired by Apollon Smyrnis in the second division, from which he left in December.

On February 12, 2015, he assumed the duties of assistant to the also newly hired Sergio Markarian in the Greece. The latter cited the tense relations between them as one of the reasons for his resignation the following July, with the dismissal of Kostenoglou contained in the same announcement where the HFF announced the departure of the first coach. On 28 February 2017, Aris announced Kostenoglou as their new coach, to finish the season. On January 23, 2018, it was announced by Doxa Drama, however, their cooperation was terminatedon April 23. On 4 February 2019, Kostenoglou was hired by AEK Athens as the technical manager of their academy. He would also temporarily be the coach of the U19 squad.

He became head coach of Cyprus on 18 February 2021.

Managerial statistics

Honours

AEK Athens
Greek Cup: 1995–96, 1996–97, 1999–2000, 2001–02
Greek Super Cup: 1996

References

External links

Το DVD της Πόλης με τη Real News
Συμφώνησε με Κωστένογλου ο Άρης για 1,5 χρόνο

1970 births
Living people
Footballers from Kavala
Greek footballers
Association football central defenders
AEK Athens F.C. players
Xanthi F.C. players
Super League Greece players
Greece international footballers
Mediterranean Games gold medalists for Greece
Mediterranean Games medalists in football
Competitors at the 1991 Mediterranean Games
Greek football managers
AEK Athens F.C. managers
Asteras Tripolis F.C. managers
Athlitiki Enosi Larissa F.C. managers
Xanthi F.C. managers
Anorthosis Famagusta F.C. managers
Aris Thessaloniki F.C. managers
Cyprus national football team managers
Super League Greece managers
Greek expatriate football managers
Greek expatriate sportspeople in Cyprus
Expatriate football managers in Cyprus